ABC 6 or 6abc may refer to one of the following television stations in the United States:

Current

Owned-and-operated stations
WPVI-TV in Philadelphia, Pennsylvania

Affiliated stations
KAAL in Austin/Rochester, Minnesota
KIVI-TV in Nampa/Boise, Idaho
KSVI in Billings, Montana
KWNB-TV in McCook, Nebraska
Satellite of KHGI-TV in Kearney, Nebraska
WABG-TV in Greenwood/Greenville, Mississippi
WATE-TV in Knoxville, Tennessee
WDAY-TV in Fargo, North Dakota
WJBF in Augusta, Georgia
WLNE-TV in Providence, Rhone Island
WRTV in Indianapolis, Indiana
WSYX in Columbus, Ohio

Formerly affiliated
KCEN-TV in Temple/Waco/Killeen, Texas (1953 to 1985; secondary until 1984)
KPVI-DT in Pocatello, Idaho (1974 to 1996)
WBRC in Birmingham, Alabama (1949 to 1996; secondary until 1961)
WITI in Milwaukee, Wisconsin (1961 to 1977)
WLUC-TV in Marquette, Michigan (secondary from 1956 to 1983; primarily from 1992 to 1995)
WTVR-TV in Richmond, Virginia (1948 to 1960; secondary until 1956)
XETV in San Diego, California (licensed to Tijuana, Baja California, Mexico; 1956 to 1973)